General elections were held in Sweden in September 1896. The Lantmanna Party received a narrow plurality of the vote. Erik Gustaf Boström remained Prime Minister.

Campaign
The Liberals and the Swedish Social Democratic Party ran joint lists in some constituencies.

Results
Only 23.9% of the male population aged over 21 was eligible to vote. Voter turnout was 45.3%.

References

Sweden
General
General elections in Sweden
Sweden